Nick Licata may refer to: 

Nick Licata (mobster), Los Angeles mobster 
Nick Licata (politician), Seattle politician